Jason Rockett (born 26 September 1969) is an English former footballer who played in the Football League for Scarborough.

External links
 

English footballers
English Football League players
Kiveton Park F.C. players
Rotherham United F.C. players
Scarborough F.C. players
1969 births
Living people
Association football defenders